Flóra Kádár (4 August 1928 – 3 January 2003) was a Hungarian actress. She was known for her roles of Mrs. Hackl in the film Sunshine, Redl's sister in the film Colonel Redl, and Erzsi, Jóska's wife in the film Adoption.

Life 
Her father was teacher Lajos Horcsák and her mother was Flóra Ohr who got married on 28 December 1926 in Székesfehérvár. Flóra Kádár's husband was DOP and photojournalist Péter Fischer, the elder brother of pianist and conductor György Fischer. György Fischer's first wife was opera singer Lucia Popp. After being divorced from Popp he married American violinist Ida Bieler.

She took a degree at the Academy of Drama and Film in Budapest in 1953. She played at the National Theatre of Szeged, Kisfaludy Theatre in Győr and Madách Theatre in Budapest.

Selected filmography 

Vihar (1952)
Young Hearts (1953) – Rózsi
2x2 néha 5 (1955)
Merry-Go-Round (1956)
Az özvegy és a százados (1967)
A völgy (1968)
Az utolsó kör (1968) – Kalauz
Az örökös (1969) – Drapp barátnõje
Virágvasárnap (1969)
Csak egy telefon (1970) – Éva szomszédasszonya
Lovefilm (1970)
Hekus lettem (1972) – Utas
A törökfejes kopja (1974)
Adoption (1975) – Erzsi, Jóska felesége
Várakozók (1975) – Egy parasztasszony
Mrs. Dery Where Are You? (1975) – Dajka
Nobody's Daughter (1976) – A feleség
Tükörképek (1976)
Amerikai cigaretta (1978) – Vendég a kocsmában
Philemon és Baucis (1978)
A trombitás (1979)
Angi Vera (1979) – Mrs. János Mikus
Vasárnapi szülök (1980) – Nevelõnõ
Koportos (1980)
Fábián Bálint találkozása Istennel (1980)
Kojak Budapesten (1980) – Portás (uncredited)
Boldog születésnapot, Marilyn! (1981) – Müvezetõnõ
Cserepek (1981)
Ideiglenes paradicsom (1981)
Havasi selyemfiú (1981)
Requiem (1982) – pedicurist
Talpra, Gyözö! (1983) – óvónéni
Vérszerzödés (1983)
Visszaesök (1983) – Ülnök
Szegény Dzsoni és Árnika (1983)
The Revolt of Job (1983)
Hanyatt-homlok (1984)
Felhöjáték (1984)
Colonel Redl (1985) – Sophie, Redl's sister
Akli Miklós (1986)
Szeleburdi vakáció (1987)
Malom a pokolban (1987)
Doktor Minorka Vidor nagy napja (1987) – Rakodó kofa
Valahol Magyarországon (1987)
Hótreál (1988)
A másik ember (1988)
Kiáltás és kiáltás (1988) – Bözsi néni
Soha, sehol, senkinek! (1988)
Sztálin menyasszonya (1991)
Halálutak és angyalok (1991)
Szomszédok (1991–1995, TV Series) Grandmother / Old Woman
Vörös vurstli (1992)
Roncsfilm (1992)
Erózió (1992)
Maigret (1992–1993, TV Series) – Nursemaid / Flower Seller
We Never Die (1993)
Hoppá (1993)
Halál sekély vízben (1994)
Mesmer (1995) – The Afflicted
All Men Are Mortal (1995) – Old Woman
Sunshine (1999) – Mrs. Hackl
Közel a szerelemhez (1999)

Selected Hungarian dubbings

References

External links 

 

1928 births
2003 deaths
Actresses from Budapest
Hungarian film actresses
Hungarian television actresses
Hungarian stage actresses
20th-century Hungarian actresses
Hungarian voice actresses